The Wudongde Dam is a large hydroelectric dam on the Jinsha River, an upper stretch of Yangtze River in Sichuan and Yunnan provinces in southwest China. 

Construction began in 2015, the first generator was scheduled to be commissioned in 2018 and the entire project completed in 2021. The power station is owned by China Three Gorges Corporation.

The first two turbines went online in July 2020. The station became fully operational in June 2021.

See also 

 List of power stations in China

References 

Hydroelectric power stations in Sichuan
Hydroelectric power stations in Yunnan
Dams on the Jinsha River
Dams in China
Buildings and structures in Kunming
2021 establishments in China
Energy infrastructure completed in 2021